Ettore Ewen (born March 1, 1986) is an American professional wrestler and former powerlifter. He is currently signed to WWE, where he performs on the SmackDown brand under the ring name Big E, but is currently inactive due to a broken neck. In addition to his singles career in professional wrestling, he is a decorated tag team wrestler as part of The New Day with Kofi Kingston and Xavier Woods.

Ewen was a collegiate football player at the University of Iowa and later became a powerlifter and a USA Powerlifting champion. He also won a state championship in high-school wrestling. Upon signing with WWE in 2009, Ewen was assigned to its developmental brand Florida Championship Wrestling (FCW) under the ring name Big E Langston. After FCW was rebranded to NXT, he became the second NXT Champion. He was promoted to WWE's main roster in December 2012, and found his greatest success as a part of The New Day, with whom he has become a two-time Raw Tag Team Champion and a six-time SmackDown Tag Team Champion. As a part of The New Day, he holds the tandem record for the longest Raw Tag Team Championship reign at 483 days. In 2020, Ewen resumed his singles career and was eventually separated from his New Day teammates in the 2020 WWE Draft. He won the men's Money in the Bank ladder match in 2021, before successfully cashing it in later that year to win the WWE Championship once, becoming the 33rd Triple Crown Champion in the company's history. Additionally, he is a two-time Intercontinental Champion.

Early life 
Ettore Ewen was born in Tampa, Florida, on March 1, 1986, the son of Margaret and Ettore Ewen. He is of Jamaican and Montserratian descent. He attended Wharton High School in Tampa, where he won a number of athletic honors, including a state championship in wrestling and being named Hillsborough County's "Ironman of the Year". Upon graduating, Ewen attended the University of Iowa, where he played American football as a defensive lineman for the Iowa Hawkeyes. He redshirted in 2004 and missed the 2005 season due to an injury sustained in preseason camp, playing a single season as a sophomore in 2006. He graduated with a Bachelor of Arts degree. After college, Ewen turned his attention to the sport of powerlifting.

Powerlifting career 

Ewen competed in his first USA Powerlifting (USAPL) meet on July 11 at the 2010 United States Open Championships at Nova Southeastern University in Davie, Florida. He became the top heavyweight lifter, breaking all four Florida state raw powerlifting records in the 275-pound class and besting raw national records in the deadlift and total. His lifts included a 611-pound squat, a 490-pound bench press, and a 749-pound deadlift for a 1,850 pound raw total. Ewen also won the 2011 USAPL Raw Nationals in Scranton, Pennsylvania. This time, he competed in the super heavyweight division (275+lbs) and broke the raw American and national records in the deadlift (799 lbs) and total (2,039 lbs). All of his national and American raw records have since been broken.

Personal records 
 Set in official competition
 Squat – 711 lbs (322.5 kg) raw without knee wraps
 Bench press – 529 lbs (240 kg) raw
 Deadlift – 799 lbs (362.5 kg) raw
 Powerlifting total – 2,039 lbs 925 kg (322.5-240-362.5) raw without knee wraps

The American and National Championship Records in the deadlift are held at 410 kg (903.9 lbs) since 1995 by Mark Henry, who also became a professional wrestler in WWE. Big E has also bench pressed 575 lbs (260 kg) raw touch and go in the gym, but it was not a competition lift.

Professional wrestling career

World Wrestling Entertainment/WWE

Florida Championship Wrestling (2009–2012) 
After injuries ended Ewen's dreams of being a professional footballer, Ewen was introduced to professional wrestling by someone who knew Jim Ross. At the suggestion of said person, Ewen was given a tryout in Florida Championship Wrestling (FCW), a developmental territory of World Wrestling Entertainment (WWE). He became convinced that he could be good at it and do wrestling for a living, and WWE signed a developmental contract with him in 2009.
According to Ewen, although he had been a wrestling fan as a child, he had "never thought this [was] something you could do for a living, and I would never have. ... Thankfully I was in the right place and the right time, and it's something that I have developed a passion for."

Ewen was assigned to FCW, where he debuted on December 17, 2009, under the ring name Big E Langston. On May 12, 2011, Langston and Calvin Raines defeated Richie Steamboat and Seth Rollins to win the FCW Florida Tag Team Championship, but they lost the championship to CJ Parker and Donny Marlow on July 21, 2011. During the WrestleMania Axxess event in April 2012, Langston defeated Antonio Cesaro.

NXT Champion (2012–2013) 
When WWE rebranded FCW into NXT, Langston made his NXT debut on August 1, 2012, defeating Adam Mercer. This marked the start of a winning streak for Langston, who from September started repeatedly performing his finisher on his opponents and demanding that referees count to five (rather than the usual three) before awarding him pinfalls. After Langston rejected Vickie Guerrero's managerial services, Guerrero promised a $5,000 bounty to anyone who could put Langston "on the shelf"; but attempts to claim the bounty by Chad Baxter and Camacho were firmly squashed by Langston. The bounty was ultimately declared void by NXT Commissioner Dusty Rhodes. Langston then began to feud with The Shield, and on the January 9, 2013 episode of NXT, Langston defeated The Shield member Seth Rollins in a No Disqualification match to win the NXT Championship. After successful title defenses against Conor O'Brian, Corey Graves, Brad Maddox, and Damien Sandow, Langston eventually lost the NXT Championship to Bo Dallas on the June 12 episode of NXT.

On the December 17, 2012 episode of Raw, Langston made his main roster debut by attacking John Cena and aligning with AJ Lee, thus establishing himself as a heel. Langston went on to act as an enforcer for AJ's boyfriend, Dolph Ziggler. On April 7, 2013, at WrestleMania 29, Langston and Ziggler unsuccessfully challenged Team Hell No (Daniel Bryan and Kane) for the WWE Tag Team Championship. Langston wrestled his first singles match on Raw the following night, defeating Daniel Bryan. After Ziggler suffered a concussion in May, Langston competed in a best-of-five series against Ziggler's opponent for the World Heavyweight Championship, Alberto Del Rio, which Del Rio won 3–2. On the June 10 episode of Raw, Langston was revealed as the secret admirer of Divas Champion Kaitlyn; this in turn was revealed to be a ploy by AJ Lee, the number one contender to Kaitlyn's title, to humiliate Kaitlyn. Langston and AJ continued to mock Kaitlyn over the following weeks, with AJ ultimately winning the title at Payback.

On the July 15 episode of Raw, Ziggler ended his relationship with AJ, which led to Langston attacking him later in the evening. On the July 29 episode of Raw, Langston was defeated by Ziggler by disqualification after AJ interfered and attacked Ziggler. In a rematch on the following week's Raw, Langston defeated Ziggler following a distraction by AJ. On August 18 at SummerSlam, Langston and AJ were defeated by Ziggler and Kaitlyn in a mixed tag team match, effectively ending their feud.

Intercontinental Champion (2013–2014) 

On the October 18 episode of SmackDown, Langston took offense to Paul Heyman, after Heyman downplaying CM Punk's victory over Langston and calling Langston "a rookie", Langston then aided Punk in fending off Curtis Axel and Ryback, turning face in the process. Three days later, on the October 21 episode of Raw, Langston teamed up with Punk to defeat Axel and Ryback, with Langston pinning Axel. He was set to receive an Intercontinental Championship match against Axel at Hell in a Cell, but Axel was pulled from the match shortly before the pay-per-view due to a legitimate hip injury. Langston then challenged for the United States Championship against Dean Ambrose at the event, winning by countout. The following night on Raw, he was granted a rematch for the title, winning the match by disqualification after Roman Reigns and Seth Rollins interfered.

On the November 18 episode of Raw, Langston received his postponed championship match with Curtis Axel, defeating him to win the Intercontinental Championship, his first singles championship on the main roster. At Survivor Series, Langston successfully retained his title against Axel. Langston then successfully retained his championship against Damien Sandow at TLC: Tables, Ladders & Chairs. On January 26, 2014, at the Royal Rumble, Langston participated in the Royal Rumble match, but was eliminated by Sheamus. At Elimination Chamber on February 23, with his ring name now shortened to Big E, he successfully defended the title against Jack Swagger. At WrestleMania XXX, Big E competed in the Andre the Giant Memorial Battle Royal, which was won by Cesaro. At Extreme Rules, Big E lost the title to Bad News Barrett, and failed to regain it the following night on Raw, ending his reign at 167 days. Big E later became involved in a feud with Rusev, which led to consecutive bouts at Payback and Money in the Bank, both of which Big E lost. At Battleground, Big E competed in a battle royal for the Intercontinental Championship, which was eventually won by The Miz.

The New Day (2014–2020) 

During the summer of 2014, Big E was put in a team with Kofi Kingston, and Xavier Woods usually as manager. In November, WWE began airing vignettes for Big E, Kingston and Woods, with the stable now being billed as The New Day. The New Day made their in-ring debut on the November 28 episode of SmackDown in a winning effort against Curtis Axel, Heath Slater and Titus O'Neil. They started a brief feud with Gold and Stardust, which Big E and Kingston defeated Gold and Stardust at the TLC: Tables, Ladders & Chairs on December 14. On January 25, 2015, at the Royal Rumble, The New Day lost to Tyson Kidd and Cesaro, ending their winning streak. Later that night, Big E participated in the Royal Rumble match, but was eliminated by Rusev. At WrestleMania 31, they failed to win the WWE Tag Team Championship in a fatal four-way match, as well as being eliminated by Big Show in the Andre the Giant Memorial Battle Royal.

On the April 6 episode of Raw, The New Day turned heel, after fans responded negatively to the group. At Extreme Rules, Big E and Kingston defeated Tyson Kidd and Cesaro to win the WWE Tag Team Championships. At Payback, The New Day defeated Kidd and Cesaro to retain their titles. At Elimination Chamber, The New Day retained the titles in the first ever tag team Elimination Chamber match, and all three members were allowed to compete in a pre-match stipulation.

They lost the titles at Money in the Bank against The Prime Time Players (Darren Young and Titus O'Neil), but they would regain the titles at SummerSlam. The following night on Raw, they started a feud with The Dudley Boyz (Bubba Ray Dudley and D-Von Dudley), setting up a title match at Night of Champions, where they lost by disqualification. The next month, at Hell in a Cell, they defeated The Dudley Boyz to retain their titles, ending their feud. At TLC: Tables, Ladders & Chairs, The New Day retained the title against The Usos (Jey Uso and Jimmy Uso) and The Lucha Dragons (Kalisto and Sin Cara) in a triple threat tag team ladder match. On January 24, 2016, at the Royal Rumble, they retained the title against The Usos.

At Fastlane on February 21, The New Day turned face by mocking The League of Nations (Sheamus, Alberto Del Rio, Rusev, and King Barrett), starting a feud. They retained their titles at Roadblock against The League of Nations. At WrestleMania 32, The New Day were defeated by The League of Nations in a six-man tag team match. The following night on Raw, they successfully retained their title against The League of Nations, ending their feud. After WrestleMania, they retained their title at Extreme Rules against The Vaudevillains (Aiden English and Simon Gotch), and at Money in the Bank against The Vaudevillains, Enzo Amore and Big Cass, and Luke Gallows and Karl Anderson in a fatal-four-way match.

On July 19 at the 2016 WWE draft, Big E, along with his fellow New Day teammates, was drafted to the Raw brand. Three days later, on July 22, The New Day became the longest-reigning WWE Tag Team Champions, breaking the record of 331 days previously set by Paul London and Brian Kendrick. After SmackDown established the WWE SmackDown Tag Team Championships due to the brand split, the titles held by the New Day were renamed the WWE Raw Tag Team Championships. On the August 1 episode of Raw, Big E suffered a storyline contusion to the groin area after an attack by Luke Gallows and Karl Anderson. At SummerSlam, Big E returned from injury by attacking Gallows and Anderson during their match against Kingston and Woods, resulting in Gallows and Anderson winning by disqualification. At Clash of Champions, The New Day retained the titles against Gallows and Anderson. At Hell in a Cell, The New Day lost to the team of Cesaro and Sheamus by disqualification but retained the titles. On the October 31 episode of Raw, The New Day revealed that they were made captain of Team Raw for the 10–on–10 Survivor Series Tag Team Elimination match at Survivor Series on November 20, 2016, which Team Raw won after defeating Team SmackDown. The New Day had two successful title defenses in November on the November 21 and 28 editions of Raw against Cesaro and Sheamus and Gallows and Anderson, respectively. On the December 12 episode of Raw, The New Day retained the titles two triple threat tag team matches, first involving Gallows and Anderson and Cesaro and Sheamus and the second involving Chris Jericho and Kevin Owens and the team of Roman Reigns and Seth Rollins. At Roadblock: End of the Line, The New Day lost the Raw Tag Team Championship to Cesaro and Sheamus, ending their record-breaking championship reign at 483 days. All members were in the Royal Rumble match but were eliminated by Sheamus and Cesaro. On February 20, 2017, they were announced as the hosts of WrestleMania 33. On April 11, 2017, Big E and The New Day were moved to the SmackDown brand as part of the Superstar Shake-up. The New Day debuted on "Talking Smack", the post-show for SmackDown Live on May 23, however, they did not wrestle or make an appearance on SmackDown Live itself.

At Battleground, Kingston and Woods, representing The New Day, defeated The Usos to win the SmackDown Tag Team Championships for the first time. Though Big E did not wrestle himself, due to The New Day defending the titles under the Freebird Rule, Big E is also recognized as a champion. The New Day lost the tag titles back to The Usos at SummerSlam. The Usos held the titles for about a month before The New Day won them back on SmackDown Live that September. At Hell in a Cell, Big E and Woods took on The Usos in the namesake match but lost the championships. On the October 23 edition of Raw, The New Day along with other talents of SmackDown ambushed the Raw wrestlers. They again appeared on the November 6 episode of Raw in the crowd, which led to the distraction of Seth Rollins and Dean Ambrose and costing them the tag titles. On the November 14 edition of SmackDown, The Shield led an attack with Raw Superstars and invaded SmackDown similar to the one that led by SmackDown and attacked everyone including New Day. At Survivor Series, The New Day lost to The Shield. The New Day failed to regain the titles from The Usos at Clash of Champions in a fatal-4-way tag team match also involving the team of Rusev and Aiden English, and Chad Gable and Shelton Benjamin. Big E entered the 2018 Royal Rumble match as the ninth entrant but failed to win the match after being eliminated by Jinder Mahal.

At Fastlane, The New Day faced The Usos for the Smackdown Tag Team Championships, but went to a no-contest after inference from The Bludgeon Brothers. Two weeks later, it was confirmed that at WrestleMania 34, The New Day would face the Usos and the Bludgeon Brothers in a triple threat tag team match for the Smackdown Tag Team Championships. The New Day failed to capture the titles at the event, which were won by The Bludgeon Brothers. On the April 11 episode of SmackDown, The New Day were defeated by The Usos in a match to determine which team would challenge The Bludgeon Brothers at the Greatest Royal Rumble event. The New Day was then defeated by SAnitY in a six-man tables match at the Extreme Rules pre-show. The New Day competed in a tag team title tournament, defeating SAnitY in the first round, while Cesaro and Sheamus defeated the Usos. The New Day then defeated Cesaro and Sheamus the following week on SmackDown to earn the right to face The Bludgeon Brothers at SummerSlam, where they won the match by disqualification, meaning the Bludgeon Brothers retained their titles. Two days later on SmackDown, however, The New Day defeated The Bludgeon Brothers in a No Disqualification match to capture the titles for the third time. Big E and Woods then represented the New Day when they unsuccessfully defended their tag titles against The Bar on SmackDown 1000.

Big E entered the 2019 Royal Rumble, but was eliminated by Samoa Joe. In the lead-up to WrestleMania 35, Big E's New Day teammate Kofi Kingston was attempting to earn a shot at the WWE Championship and after many attempts, WWE Chairman Vince McMahon granted him the title shot after Big E and Xavier Woods defeated Luke Gallows and Karl Anderson, Shinsuke Nakamura and Rusev, The Bar, The Usos, and Daniel Bryan and Erick Rowan in a tag team gauntlet match. Shortly after WrestleMania, Big E suffered a legitimate knee injury which sidelined him for weeks. He later returned and eventually earned another SmackDown tag team title opportunity at Extreme Rules. At the event, Big E and Xavier Woods defeated Daniel Bryan and Erick Rowan, and Heavy Machinery to win the titles (during this reign, Kingston was not recognized as champion as he was the reigning WWE Champion). They lost the titles to The Revival at Clash of Champions, but regained it on the November 8 episode of SmackDown, becoming record five-time champions as a team, and a record fifth reign for Big E individually (Woods is not recognized for this reign due to an injury). At TLC: Tables, Ladders & Chairs, Big E and Kingston successfully defended the titles against The Revival in a ladder match. On January 26, 2020, at the Royal Rumble, Big E participated in the Royal Rumble match but was eliminated by Brock Lesnar.

At Super ShowDown, Big E and Kingston lost the championships against John Morrison and the Miz and failed to regain the titles at Elimination Chamber. On the April 17 episode of SmackDown, Big E, who represented The New Day, won the titles back from Miz, who represented himself and Morrison, in a triple threat match, also involving Jey Uso, who represented The Usos, and this makes The New Day six-time SmackDown Tag Team Champions.  At The Horror Show at Extreme Rules, The New Day would lose the championships to Cesaro and Shinsuke Nakamura in a Tables match after Cesaro and Nakamura put Kingston through two tables.

Return to singles career (2020–2021) 
On the July 24 episode of SmackDown, Kingston revealed that he would be out of action for six weeks and gave Big E the blessing to go on a solo run. Big E would then embark on his singles run as he entered a feud with Sheamus, defeating him at Payback in a singles match and once again on the October 9 episode of SmackDown in a Falls Count Anywhere match. As part of the 2020 Draft in October, Kingston and Woods were drafted to the Raw brand while Big E remained on the SmackDown brand, starting a singles career which included a new theme by Wale and titantron separate from The New Day.

On the December 25 episode of SmackDown (taped on December 22), Big E defeated Sami Zayn in a lumberjack match to win the Intercontinental Championship for the second time. On the January 8, 2021 episode of SmackDown, Big E defended the Intercontinental Championship against Apollo Crews, and the match ended in a double-pinfall draw, but after a match restart, Big E scored the victory. On the January 22 episode of SmackDown, his match with Crews ended in a no contest after Zayn interfered and attacked both of them. At the Royal Rumble event, Big E entered the Royal Rumble match and eliminated Zayn, Mustafa Ali, The Hurricane, and Bobby Lashley, before being eliminated by Omos (who was not a part of the match).

On the February 5 episode on SmackDown, Big E retained his title against Crews and Zayn in a triple threat match. Following this, Crews would began to target Big E to the point where Crews injured Big E, taking him out of action for several weeks. Big E returned on the March 12 episode of SmackDown, accepting Crews' offer for a rematch at Fastlane. At Fastlane, Big E would once again retain the championship but would be attacked by Crews after the match. On the March 26 episode of SmackDown, Big E was pinned by Crews in a six-man tag match, which gave Crews another opportunity for the championship at WrestleMania 37. At WrestleMania, Big E lost the Intercontinental Championship to Crews in a Nigerian Drum Fight due to interference from Commander Azeez. He challenged Crews for the Intercontinental Championship on the May 21 episode of Smackdown in a fatal 4-way which included Kevin Owens and Sami Zayn, but was unsuccessful when Aleister Black attacked him. The potential feud was soon dropped when Black was released by WWE.

WWE Champion (2021–2022) 
On the June 25 episode of SmackDown, Big E defeated Crews to qualify for the men's Money in the Bank ladder match. At Money in the Bank, he won the men's ladder match, becoming the first African-American competitor to hold the contract. On the August 13 episode of SmackDown, Baron Corbin stole his briefcase during a backstage interview. At SummerSlam, Big E defeated Corbin to regain the briefcase.

On September 13, 2021, Big E declared on Twitter that he would be cashing in his Money in the Bank contract for a WWE Championship match on that night's episode of Raw, which already had a WWE Championship match scheduled between champion Bobby Lashley and challenger Randy Orton. Once Lashley defeated Orton in a 13-minute match, Big E duly cashed in for an immediate title match and pinned Lashley, winning the WWE Championship for the first time in his career, and celebrating with the rest of the New Day. On the September 20 Raw, Big E lost two matches, first in a trios match pitting New Day against Roman Reigns (the Universal Champion) and the Usos, then the second in a triple threat match against Reigns and Lashley. On the September 27 Raw, Big E defeated Lashley in a cage match for the WWE Championship.

During the first night of the 2021 WWE Draft on the October 1 episode of SmackDown, Big E was officially drafted to Raw, while Kingston and Woods were drafted to SmackDown. The new rosters were set to officially go into effect on October 22, the night after Crown Jewel, where Big E successfully defended the WWE Championship against Drew McIntyre. At Survivor Series, Big E faced WWE Universal Champion Roman Reigns in a non-title match, where he suffered a clean loss to Reigns. On the November 22 episode of Raw, Big E had a successful title defense against Austin Theory.

Big E was originally scheduled to defend his WWE Championship at the WWE Day 1 event against Seth Rollins. On the November 29 Raw, Big E lost to Kevin Owens in a non-title match via disqualification after Rollins interfered, so Owens was added to Big E's Day One title match. On the December 13 Raw, Big E was pinned by Bobby Lashley in a non-title no disqualification match after Rollins, Owens and MVP interfered, so Lashley was added to Big E's title match. Hours before Day 1, due to WWE Universal Champion Roman Reigns contracting COVID-19, Reigns' scheduled opponent Brock Lesnar was also added to Big E's title match. In the fatal five-way match on January 1, 2022, Big E lost his title when he was cleanly pinned by Lesnar, ending Big E's reign at 110 days. On the January 3 Raw, Big E wrestled Lashley, Owens and Rollins for a WWE Championship shot against Lesnar, but Lashley won. One week later on Raw, Big E challenged Rollins to an immediate match and suffered a clean loss.

In an interview published in March 2022, Ewen gave his views on his WWE Championship reign, stating that if it were up to him, he would choose a "longer" reign so that he could "do some more dynamic things". Ewen further stated that it was "difficult [for people] to really latch onto a new champion" when "within their first month, [the champion has] multiple losses on TV". Ewen then compared his world title reign and how it ended to Kofi Kingston's, suggesting that both of them had a "falling off of a cliff feeling at the hands of one Brock Lesnar and then suddenly, it feels like you woke up a year prior and you're back to doing what you were doing before."

New Day reunion and neck injury (2022–present) 
In late January 2022, Big E was officially moved back to SmackDown, reuniting with Kofi Kingston as part of New Day, and feuding with Happy Corbin and Madcap Moss. Big E participated in the Royal Rumble match at the namesake event, scored no eliminations, and was eliminated by Randy Orton and Riddle. In February 2022, New Day feuded with Los Lotharios (Angel Garza and Humberto Carrillo).

In March 2022, New Day feuded with the team of Sheamus and Ridge Holland. A match between the teams on the March 11 episode of SmackDown saw Holland delivering an overhead belly-to-belly suplex to Big E at ringside, resulting in Big E landing on the top of his head; Big E was later placed on a stretcher and taken to a hospital. On social media, Big E stated that he had suffered a broken neck, with fractures to his C1 vertebrae and C6 vertebrae, but no ligament or spinal cord injury. He also said that he would not require surgery for his injury, and thanked people for their concern. He had an onscreen reunion with Kingston and Woods on May 20, but stated in an interview a month later that it is unclear if he will ever be able to wrestle again. In the same interview, he revealed that Triple H had asked him to be part of a WWE tryout for college athletes in the days leading up to that year's SummerSlam.

Filmography

Television

Film

Video games

Championships and accomplishments 

 Florida Championship Wrestling
 FCW Florida Tag Team Championship (1 time) – with Calvin Raines
 Pro Wrestling Illustrated
 Tag Team of the Year (2015, 2016) 
 Ranked No. 9 of the top 500 singles wrestlers in the PWI 500 in 2022
 Ranked No. 8 of the top 50 tag teams in the PWI Tag Team 50 in 2020 
 Sports Illustrated
 Ranked No. 6 of the top 10 wrestlers in 2021
 Wrestling Observer Newsletter
 Best Gimmick (2015) 
Shad Gaspard/Jon Huber Memorial Award (2020)
 WWE
 WWE Championship (1 time)
 NXT Championship (1 time)
 WWE Intercontinental Championship (2 times)
 WWE (Raw) Tag Team Championship (2 times) – with Kofi Kingston and Xavier Woods
 WWE SmackDown Tag Team Championship (6 times) – with Kofi Kingston and Xavier Woods 
 WWE SmackDown Tag Team Championship Tournament (2018)
Men's Money in the Bank (2021)
 33rd Triple Crown Champion
 WWE Year-End Award (1 time)
 WWE Year-End Award for Men's Tag Team of the Year (2019) – with Kofi Kingston and Xavier Woods
 Slammy Award (1 time)
 Ring Gear of the Year (2020) – with Kofi Kingston and Xavier Woods

Notes

References

External links 

 
 
 
 
 

1986 births
21st-century professional wrestlers
African-American players of American football
African-American male professional wrestlers
American football defensive linemen
American male professional wrestlers
American male sport wrestlers
American people of Montserratian descent
American powerlifters
Iowa Hawkeyes football players
Living people
NXT Champions
Players of American football from Florida
Sportspeople from Tampa, Florida
University of Iowa alumni
WWE Champions
WWF/WWE Intercontinental Champions
21st-century African-American sportspeople
American sportspeople of Jamaican descent
20th-century African-American people
FCW Florida Tag Team Champions